USNS 1st Lt. Jack Lummus (T-AK-3011), (former MV 1st Lt. Jack Lummus (AK-3011)), is the fourth ship of the  built in 1986. The ship is named after First Lieutenant Jack Lummus, an American Marine who was awarded the Medal of Honor during World War II.

Construction and commissioning 
The ship was laid down in June 1984 and launched on 22 February 1985 at the Fore River Shipyard, Quincy, Massachusetts. Later acquired on 6 March 1986 by the Maritime Administration for operation by American Overseas Marine.

From 2 August 1990 until 28 February 1991, the ship took part in Operation Desert Storm by transporting equipments and supplies. Jack Lummus also participated in Operation Restore Hope from 5 December 1992 until 4 May 1993 and became the first ship to arrive in Mogadishu.

The ship was anchored off Sattahip, during Exercise Cobra Gold 2002. On 17 January 2006, the ship was purchased by the Military Sealift Command and was put into the Prepositioning Program and the Maritime Prepositioning Ship Squadron 3. The ship operates in the Pacific Ocean, between Guam and Saipan. 

She also took part in Exercise Cobra Gold 2011. In 2015, nearly 50 Marines with Combat Logistics Regiment 25, 2nd Marine Logistics Group were assigned to Jack Lummus. The ship took part in Exercise Freedom Banner 2013. On 29 March 2016, Jack Lummus arrived at Subic Bay for  Exercise Balikatan 2016. From 24 to 28 May 2018, the ship carried equipments and supplies to support Exercise Balikatan 2018.

Gallery

References

2nd Lt John P. Bobo-class dry cargo ship
1986 ships
Ships built in Quincy, Massachusetts
Gulf War ships of the United States
Merchant ships of the United States
Bulk carriers of the United States Navy
Container ships of the United States Navy